Madhubala (1933–1969) was an Indian actress and producer who appeared in 73 Hindi-language films in a career spanning from early 1940s to mid-1960s. She made her debut at age 9 playing an uncredited role in the romantic musical Basant (1942). In 1944, she signed a contract with Ranjit Movietone, under which she featured in minor roles for the next two years. The contract ended in 1947, prompting director Kidar Sharma to cast Madhubala as the leading lady in the drama Neel Kamal (1947). Although a commercial failure, the film garnered her critical praise, and she subsequently rose to prominence after playing key characters in the drama Lal Dupatta (1948) and the horror film Mahal (1949). For a brief period, Madhubala continued starring in a number of successful productions, including the romantic musical Dulari (1949), the dramas Beqasoor (1950) and Sangdil (1952), and the romances Badal (1951) and Tarana (1951), frequently collaborating with actors such as Dev Anand, Dilip Kumar and Prem Nath.

Dissatisfied with typecasting, in 1953 Madhubala founded her own production company, called Madhubala Private Ltd.. She afterwards played an author-backed role in Mehboob Khan's romantic drama Amar (1954) and produced the social film Naata (1955)—in which she also acted—but both the films proved to be financially unsuccessful, which led the press to label her "box office poison". Madhubala's career took a turning point in 1955 when she starred alongside filmmaker Guru Dutt as a spoilt heiress in his production Mr. & Mrs. '55 (1955), a highly successful romantic comedy that satirized marriage of convenience. She then advanced her career by performing a wider variety of roles in the period films Raj Hath and Shirin Farhad (both 1956), the black comedy Gateway of India and the drama Ek Saal (both 1957).

Madhubala's popularity soared in the late 1950s and she received critical attention for her work in several films, that often co-starred actors including Kishore Kumar, Dev Anand and Bharat Bhushan. She portrayed a journalist in the thriller Kala Pani (1958), a bar dancer in the crime drama Howrah Bridge (1958), a city-based mondaine in the comedy Chalti Ka Naam Gaadi (1958), and a mullish youth in the musical Barsaat Ki Raat (1960)—which along with the musicals Phagun (1958) and Jhumroo (1961), and the comedies Boy Friend (1961) and Half Ticket (1962)—ranked among the highest-grossing films of their respective years. Film historian Dinesh Raheja has described K. Asif's 1960 historical epic drama Mughal-e-Azam, in which Madhubala played the 16th-century courtesan Anarkali, as the "crowning glory" of her career. She received a Filmfare nomination for her portrayal, which has been since considered by critics as one of the greatest performances in Indian cinematic history. After producing the tepidly received comedies Mehlon Ke Khwab (1960) and Pathan (1962), Madhubala began reducing her workload. The last film she completed was the drama Sharabi, which was released in 1964 following several delays. Two years after her death in 1969, she had a posthumous release in the action film Jwala (1971), which marked her final film role.

Filmography

Producer roles

Footnotes

References

Citations

Works cited

External links 
 
 Madhubala on Bollywood Hungama

Indian filmographies
Actress filmographies